Harasta al-Qantarah (also spelled Harasta Elqantara) is a Syrian village located in Markaz Rif Dimashq, Douma District. Harasta al-Qantarah had a population of 2,513 in the 2004 census.

References 

Populated places in Douma District